Veneri may refer to:

 Giacomo Veneri de Racaneto (died 1460), Roman Catholic Archbishop of Dubrovnik 
 Pietro Veneri (born 1964), Italian conductor, and professor of conducting at the Conservatorio Arrigo Boito in Parma
 Veneri al sole, a 1965 Italian comedy film directed by Marino Girolami

See also
 Venerini (disambiguation)